Eka or EKA may refer to:

People 
 Eka Budianta (born 1956), Indonesian poet
 Eka Darville (born 1989), Australian actor
 Eka Gigauri (born 1978), Georgian activist
 Eka Gurtskaia (born ), Georgian beauty pageant titleholder
 Eka Kurniawan (born 1975), Indonesian writer
 Eka Ramdani (born 1984), Indonesian footballer
 Eka Santika (born 1982), Indonesian footballer
 Eka Tkeshelashvili (born 1977), Georgian jurist and politician
 Eka Esu Williams (born 1950), Nigerian immunologist and activist
 Eka Zguladze (born 1978), Georgian and Ukrainian government official
 David W. Eka (born 1945), Mormon church leader in West Africa
 Eka (actress), Bangladeshi actress
 Gustaf Magnusson (1902–1993), Finnish major general and flying ace nicknamed "Eka"

Other uses 
 EKA (knives), a Swedish knife manufacturer
 EKA (supercomputer)
 Eka, Firozabad, a town in Uttar Pradesh, India
 Eka tala, a tala in Carnatic music
 Eka language, a Loloish language of China
 Ekajuk language (ISO-639: eka), an Ekoid language of China
 Estonian Academy of Arts
 Murray Field, an airport in California, United States
 Eka-, a prefix used to name chemical elements predicted by Mendeleev
 Eka (beetle), a genus of leaf beetles from the Seychelles